The United Nations Scientific Committee on the Effects of Atomic Radiation (UNSCEAR) was set up by resolution of the United Nations General Assembly in 1955. 21 states are designated to provide scientists to serve as members of the committee which holds formal meetings (sessions) annually and submits a report to the General Assembly. The organisation has no power to set radiation standards nor to make recommendations in regard to nuclear testing. It was established solely to "define precisely the present exposure of the population of the world to ionizing radiation." A small secretariat, located in Vienna and functionally linked to the UN Environment Program, organizes the annual sessions and manages the preparation of documents for the committee's scrutiny.

Function

UNSCEAR issues major public reports on Sources and Effects of Ionizing Radiation from time to time. As of 2017, there have been 28 major publications from 1958 to 2017.  The reports are all available from the UNSCEAR website. These works are very highly regarded as sources of authoritative information and are used throughout the world as a scientific basis for evaluation of radiation risk. The publications review studies undertaken separately from a range of sources. Reports from UN member states and other international organisations on data from survivors of the atomic bombings of Hiroshima and Nagasaki, the Chernobyl disaster, accidental, occupational, and medical exposure to ionizing radiation.

Administration

Originally, in 1955, India and the Soviet Union wanted to add several neutralist and communist states, such as mainland China. Eventually a compromise with the US was made and Argentina, Belgium, Egypt and Mexico were permitted to join. The organisation was charged with collecting all available data on the effects of "ionising radiation upon man and his environment." (James J. Wadsworth - American representative to the General Assembly).

The committee was originally based in the Secretariat Building in New York City, but moved to Vienna in 1974.

The Secretaries of the Committee have been:

 Dr. Ray K. Appleyard (UK) (1956–1961)
 Dr. Francesco Sella (Italy) (1961–1974)
 Dr. Dan Jacobo Beninson (Argentina) (1974–1979)
 Dr. Giovanni Silini (Italy) (1980–1988)
 Dr. Burton Bennett (1988 acting; 1991–2000)
 Dr. Norman Gentner (2001–2004; 2005 acting)
 Dr. Malcolm Crick (2005–2018)
 Dr. Ferid Shannoun (2018 - 2019 acting)
 Ms. Borislava Batandjieva-Metcalf

Contents of UNSCEAR 2008 report
UNSCEAR has published 20 major reports, latest is the summary 2010 (14 pages), last full report is 2008 report Vol.I and Vol.II with scientific annexes (A to E).

"UNSCEAR 2008 REPORT Vol.I" main report and 2 scientific annexes

 Report to the General Assembly (without scientific annexes; 24 pages)
Includes short overviews of the materials and conclusions contained in the scientific annexes

 Scientific Annex
 Annex A - "Medical radiation exposures" (202 pages)
 Annex B - "Exposures of the public and workers from various sources of radiation" (245 pages)
 Tables (downloadable) "Public.xls" (A1 to A14), "Worker.xls" (A15 to A31)

"UNSCEAR 2008 REPORT Vol.II" 3 scientific annexes
 Annex C - "Radiation exposures in accidents" (49 pages)
 Annex D - "Health effects due to radiation from the Chernobyl accident" (179 pages)
 Annex E - "Effects of ionizing radiation on non-human biota" (97 pages)

See also
 Elagu V. Elaguppillai
 European Committee on Radiation Risk
 Fukushima I nuclear accidents
 International Commission on Radiological Protection
 Radiation protection

References

External links
UNSCEAR Website
UNSCEAR Publications

Radiation health effects
Nuclear organizations
United Nations General Assembly subsidiary organs
Radiation protection organizations
United Nations organizations based in Vienna
1955 establishments in New York City